Maryland State College may refer to:
University of Maryland, College Park, which was known as Maryland State College from 1916 to 1920
University of Maryland Eastern Shore, which was known as Maryland State College from 1948 to 1970